The Capture of Monterrey took place on 29 August 1864. It was fought between elements of the Mexican republican army and troops of the Second Mexican Empire during the Second French intervention in Mexico.

References

Conflicts in 1864
1864 in Mexico
Battles of the Second French intervention in Mexico
History of Nuevo León
History of Monterrey
August 1864 events
19th century in Monterrey